Alexey Nikolaev or Aleksey Nikolaev may refer to:

 Alexey Nikolaev (archer) (born 1987), Russian archer
 Aleksey Nikolaev (footballer, born 1979), Russian-Uzbekistan footballer for FK Samarqand-Dinamo
 Aleksei Nikolaev (referee) (born 1971), Russian football referee
 Alexey Grigoryevich Nikolayev, Soviet Army officer and Hero of the Soviet Union
 Aleksei Lvovich Nikolayev (born 1985), Russian footballer for FC Torpedo Armavir
 Aleksey Nikolaev (wrestler), Belarusian freestyle wrestler